The Parliamentary Under-Secretary of State for International Trade (Minister for International Trade) is a junior position in the Department for International Trade of the Government of the United Kingdom.

Responsibilities 
The minister has responsibility of the following policy areas:

 Future free trade agreements
 Trade agreement continuity
 Export controls
 Tackling barriers to market access

He also supports the Secretary of State with:

 Trade remedies
 Trade dialogues
 Joint economic and trade committees

List of officeholders 

 Ranil Jayawardena (5 May 2020 – 6 September 2022)
 James Duddridge (8 September 2022 – 26 October 2022)
 Nigel Huddleston (30 October 2022 – present)

References 

Trade in the United Kingdom
Department for International Trade
Trade ministers of the United Kingdom
2016 establishments in the United Kingdom